Sophie Haywood (born 10 January 1996) is an English professional footballer who plays as a forward for FA Championship club Sheffield United. She spent two years in the United States alongside her studies at Texas A&M University on a sporting scholarship.

Club career 
Haywood joined Aston Villa on 1 July 2018.

Career statistics

Club

Notes

References

1996 births
Living people
English women's footballers
Women's association football forwards
Aston Villa W.F.C. players
Women's Championship (England) players
Women's Super League players
Notts County L.F.C. players